2-Decenal (dec-2-enal) is an organic compound with the chemical formula of C10H18O. It exists as a pair of cis and trans isomers, (2E)-2-decenal and (2Z)-2-decenal. It is an oily, clear liquid under normal conditions, that may be yellow due to impurities. 2-Decenal is described as having a strong, waxy odor. It is found in animal food (in trace quantities), and is part of the essential oil of coriander. 2-Decenal is also used as a flavoring agent.

Occurrence 
2-Decenal is found in a wide variety of foods. It has been reported in bitter orange peel, blackberry, ginger, butter, mushroom, kiwi, bacon fat, roast beef, beef fat, heated beef fat, bilberries, carrot root, boiled chicken, chicken broth, cranberry press residue, ham, lingonberry, orange, heated pork fat, potato chip, soy bean, boiled mutton, tea, roasted hazelnuts, french fries, tomato, wheat bread,  roasted pecans, rice, roasted peanuts, and coriander leaf. Alongside (E)-2-dodecenal, the presence of this aldehyde in coriander leaf has been linked to a commonly reported distaste for the herb among people with a certain variant of the OR6A2 gene.

2-Decenal is also found as an additive in cigarettes.

Applications 
2-Decenal can be used as a nematicide (a pesticide used to kill plant-parasitic nematodes). It is a mutagen, but it also has a biological role as a pheromone, which is released by an organism when damaged by a predator which warns other individuals that there is a danger.

Synthesis 
2-Decenal can be synthesized by reacting octanal with ethyl vinyl ether, and subsequently hydrolyzing the mixture.

References 

Aldehydes
Fatty aldehydes